Laubuka lankensis, also known as the Sri Lanka blue laubuca, is a cyprinid fish species endemic to Sri Lanka. It is a freshwater species widely distributed throughout the lowland dry zone of the island. It grows to  standard length.

References

Laubuka
Freshwater fish of Sri Lanka
Endemic fauna of Sri Lanka
Fish described in 1960
Taxa named by Paulus Edward Pieris Deraniyagala